Phuturistix is an English musical duo consisting of Zed Bias (real name Dave Jones) and DJ Injekta (real name Sefton Motley) who operate within the UK garage and broken beat genres. Phuturistix has released one album on Hospital Records and one album on its self-run Phuture Lounge Recordings.

Discography

Albums
Feel It Out (2003), Hospital Records
Breathe Some Light (2007), Phuture Lounge

Singles and EPs
Matrix EP (2000), Locked On
Deepdown EP (2001), Locked On
"Feel It Out" (2003), Hospital Records
"Beautiful" (2003), Hospital Records
"Beautiful (Remixes)" (2003), Hospital Records
"Cohiba" (2005), Phuture Lounge
"Fly Away" (2006), Phuture Lounge

References

External links
Phuture Lounge, a record label founded and run by Phuturistix
Phuturistix on Myspace

English electronic music duos
Remixers
Musical groups from Manchester
DJs from Manchester
DJ duos
UK garage duos
Musical groups established in the 1990s
Electronic dance music duos
Locked On Records artists